Mike Whitaker (born 8 November 1951) is a Canadian former breaststroke swimmer. He competed in two events at the 1972 Summer Olympics.

References

External links
 

1951 births
Living people
Canadian male breaststroke swimmers
Olympic swimmers of Canada
Swimmers at the 1972 Summer Olympics
Swimmers from Edmonton